Enrico Cerulli (15 February 1898 - 19 September 1988) was an Italian scholar of Somali and Ethiopian studies, a governor and a diplomat.

Biography
Cerulli was born in Naples, Italy in 1898. He wrote his doctoral thesis at the University of Naples Federico II on the traditional law of the Somali. At the same time, he studied Ethio-Semitic languages under Francesco Gallina, and Arabic and Islamic studies under Carlo Alfonso Nallino and Giorgio Levi Della Vida at the Regio Istituto Orientale (later Istituto Universitario Orientale, today Università di Napoli "L'Orientale").

Cerulli is also renowned for his studies on the Latin and Old French translation of the Arabic Kitab al-Miraj, a famous Muslim book concerned with Muhammad's ascension into Heaven (known as the Mi'raj), following his miraculous one-night journey from Mecca to Jerusalem (the Isra). The book's Islamic depictions of Hell are believed by some scholars, including Cerulli, to have been a major influence on Dante's 14th century masterpiece, the Divine Comedy.

Between January 1939 and June 1940, Cerulli was Governor of Scioa (Shewa) and later of Harar, two provinces of Italian East Africa. He also headed the political office for East Africa in the Ministry of Foreign Affairs.

The restored regime of Haile Selassie I approached the United Nations in 1948 to have him tried for war crimes, along with nine others. However, the UN commission agreed to call him as a witness only. The Ethiopian government then dropped charges but barred him permanently from entering Ethiopia.

Later, from 1950 to 1954, Cerulli served as the Italian Ambassador to Iran.

Finally he was named President of Accademia Nazionale dei Lincei in Rome.

Works
 1922: Folk-literature of the Galla of Southern Abyssinia. Cambridge, MA.
 1930-1933: Etiopia Occidentale (dallo Scioa alla frontiera del Sudan). Note del viaggio, 1927-1928. 2 Vols. Roma.
 1931: Documenti arabi per la storia dell'Etiopia. Roma: G. Bardi.
 1936: Studi etiopici. Vol. I: La lingua e la storia di Harar. Roma: Istituto per l'Oriente.
 1936: Studi etiopici. Vol. II: La lingue e la storia dei Sidamo. Roma: Istituto per l'Oriente.
 1938: Studi etiopici. Vol. III: Il linguaggio dei Giangerò ed alcune lingue Sidama dell'Omo (Basket, Ciara, Zaissè). Roma; Istituto per l'Oriente. [reprinted: 1963]
 1943: Il Libro etiopico dei Miracoli di Maria e le sue fonti nelle letterature del Medio Evo latino. Roma.
 1943-1947: Etiopi in Palestina: storia della comunità etiopica di Gerusalemme. 2 vols. Roma: Libreria dello Stato.
 1949: Il 'Libro della Scala' e la questione delle fonti arabo-spagnole della Divina Commedia. Città del Vaticano.
 1951: Studi etiopici. Vol. IV: La lingua Caffina. Roma: Istituto per l'Oriente.
 1956: (ed.) Atti di Krestos Samra. (Corpus Scriptorum Christianorum Orientalium, 163–164; Scriptores Aetiopici, 33–34) Louvain.
 1957-1964: Somalia: scritti vari editi ed inediti. 3 vols.
 1958: Storia della letteratura etiopica. Milano. [3rd. ed. 1968].
 1958-1960: Scritti teologici etiopici dei secoli XVI-XVII. 2 vols. Città del Vaticano.
 1959: (ed.) Atti di Giulio di Aqfahs. (Corpus Scriptorum Christianorum Orientalium, 190–191; Scriptores Aetiopici, 37–38) Louvain.
 1971: (with: Fabrizio A. Pennacchietti) Testi neo-aramaici dell’Iran settentrionale. Napoli : Istituto Universitario Orientale di Napoli.
 1971: L'Islam di ieri e di oggi. Roma. Istituto per l'Oriente

See also
Somali Studies
Ethiopian Studies

Notes

References
 Pankhurst, Richard (1999). "Italian Fascist War Crimes in Ethiopia", in: Northeast African Studies 6/1-2 (New series), pp. 83–140.
 Ricci, Lanfranco (1988 [1990]). "Enrico Cerulli", in: Rassegna di Studi Etiopici 32, pp. 4–19; "Bibliografia" (by Gianfrancesco Lusini), pp. 20–44; "errata-corrige", 33 (1989 [1991]), pp. 197–198.
 Ricci, Lanfranco (2003). "Cerulli, Enrico", in: S. Uhlig et al. (eds.), Encyclopaedia Aethiopica Vol. 1: A-C (Wiesbadn: Harrassowitz), pp. 708b-709b.
 Mallette, Karla (2010). European Modernity and the Arab Mediterranean. Pennsylvania University Press: Philadelphia
 Celli, Andrea (2013). Dante e l'Oriente. Le fonti islamiche nella storiografia novecentesca. Roma: Carocci, pp. 25–70.

External links
 «Enrico Cerulli» (Filippo Bertotti). , in: Encyclopaedia Iranica.

1898 births
1988 deaths
Ethiopianists
Heads of universities in Italy
Writers from Naples
Somalists
University of Naples Federico II alumni
Ambassadors of Italy to Iran
Corresponding Fellows of the British Academy